Beran may refer to:

 Beran, type of grape better known as Malbec
 Beran, Iran, village in Baryaji Rural District, Sardasht County, West Azerbaijan Province
 Beran (surname), Slavic surname
 Beran Bertuğ, Turkish politician
 Beran Selo, selo in Montenegro